Raymond John Hitchcock (9 February 1922 – 23 February 1992) was an English novelist, screenwriter, and cartoonist,<ref>"Raymond Hitchcock", The Encyclopedia of Science Fiction. 20 August 2012, retrieved 8 February 2013.</ref> He is best remembered for his novel Percy, which was the basis for a 1971 film of the same name. Several of his earlier books were light-hearted sexual farces; his later titles included several thrillers. He was the father of English musician Robyn Hitchcock. His daughter Lal is a sculptor, and daughter Fleur is a children's author.

Hitchcock was born in Calcutta, India in 1922 to English parents. At age 22, one of his legs was wounded during the Allied forces invasion of Normandy, giving him limited use of it for the remainder of his life and rendering him functionally disabled. He spent 9 months in hospital recovering and narrowly escaped having to have the leg amputated. 
   
He trained as an engineer, working in telecommunications, before abandoning this career to concentrate on creating cartoons. From there he drifted into writing, his first novel being successful enough to be turned into a film of the same title. Apart from writing novels, he wrote the screenplays of several short plays which appeared in such series as Play for Today and Thirty-Minute Theatre.

Hitchcock died of cancer in Winchester, England in 1992 shortly after his 70th birthday.

BooksPercy (1969)The Gilt Edged Boy (1971)Percy's Progress (1972)There's a Girl in My Soup (novelisation of the film of the same name; 1972)Venus 13: A Cautionary Space Tale (1972)Attack the Lusitania! (1979)The Canaris Legacy (1980)Sea Wrack (1982)Archangel 006 (1983)Checkmate Budapest'' (1988)

References

External links

1922 births
1992 deaths
English male screenwriters
20th-century English novelists
20th-century English screenwriters
20th-century English male writers
British people in colonial India
British military personnel of World War II